The True Colonist Van Diemen's Land Political Despatch, And Agricultural And Commercial Advertiser was a newspaper published in Hobart, Tasmania, Australia.

History 
The newspaper was published by Gilbert Robertson from 5 August 1834  (Volume 1 No 1) to 26 December 1844.

Digitisation 
The newspaper has been digitised and is available via Trove.

References

Defunct newspapers published in Tasmania
1834 establishments in Australia
Newspapers on Trove
1844 disestablishments in Australia
Newspapers in Hobart, Tasmania